Storia di Anna (translated: "Story of Anna") is a 1981 Italian drama television miniseries directed by Salvatore Nocita and starring Laura Lattuada. It is the first Italian series to have drug dependence as main theme. It is based on an early script by Renato Castellani.

Cast
 
Laura Lattuada as   Anna
 Mario Cordova as  Roberto
 Luciano Melani 
Flavio Bucci 
 Valentina Fortunato 
Luigi Pistilli 
Tino Schirinzi 
 Fiorenza Marchegiani 
 Sergio Renda 
 Alberto Cancemi 
 Valeria Fabrizi

References

External links
 

1981 television films
1981 films
Italian television films
Films directed by Salvatore Nocita
Television shows about drugs
RAI original programming
1980s Italian films